Stoke-on-Trent South is a constituency created in 1950, and represented in the House of Commons of the UK Parliament since 2017 by Jack Brereton, a Conservative. The local electorate returned a Labour MP in every election until 2017, when Brereton became its first Conservative MP.  The seat is non-rural and in the upper valley of the Trent covering half of the main city of the Potteries, a major ceramics centre since the 17th century.

Previously a safe Labour seat, it is now held by the Conservatives by a majority of over 11,000, having gained the seat in the 2017 election and hugely increased their vote in the 2019 election.

Members of Parliament

Boundaries

2010–present: The City of Stoke-on-Trent wards of Blurton, Fenton, Longton North, Longton South, Meir Park and Sandon, Trentham and Hanford, and Weston and Meir North.

1983–2010: The City of Stoke-on-Trent wards of Blurton, Fenton Green, Great Fenton, Longton South, Meir Park, Trentham Park, and Weston.

1955–1983: The County Borough of Stoke-on-Trent wards numbers 17, 18, 19, 20, 21, 22, 23, and 24.

1950–1955: The County Borough of Stoke-on-Trent wards numbers 19, 20, 21, 22, 23, 24, 25, and 26.

Constituency profile
A former safe Labour seat, like the other Stoke-on-Trent constituencies, it includes the city's most middle-class electoral wards of Meir that contrast with much of the neighbouring, predominantly lower income, population of the other wards.

The seat is home to Stoke City F.C. whose Bet365 Stadium is at the northern edge of the constituency.

Workless claimants, registered jobseekers, were in November 2012 equal to the regional average of 4.7% of the population based on a statistical compilation by The Guardian.

History

Political history
The constituency and its predecessor was a safe Labour seat from 1935 until the 2010s when it became marginal. It was won by the Conservative Party for the first time in 2017.  At the 2019 election the Conservatives increased their majority to over 11,000 with a vote share of 62%.

Prominent members 
Jack Ashley (later Lord Ashley), became deaf as a result of an operation, but his disability campaigns led to major enactments and public sector changes to improve ordinary life for deaf people, including the inclusion of sign language in television programmes and campaigns to help other disabled people.

Elections

Elections in the 2010s

Elections in the 2000s

Elections in the 1990s

Elections of the 1980s

Elections of the 1970s

Elections of the 1960s

Elections of the 1950s

See also
List of parliamentary constituencies in Staffordshire

Notes

References

Parliamentary constituencies in Staffordshire
Politics of Stoke-on-Trent
Constituencies of the Parliament of the United Kingdom established in 1950